Bale is a village and former civil parish, now in the parish of Gunthorpe, in the North Norfolk district, in the county of Norfolk, England. The village is on the north side of the A148 King's Lynn to Cromer road. The village is 9 miles east north east of the town of Fakenham, 14.3 miles west south west of Cromer and 125 miles north north east of London. The nearest railway station is at Sheringham for the Bittern Line which runs between Sheringham, Cromer and Norwich. The nearest airport is Norwich International Airport. In 1931 the parish had a population of 208.

History
Bale has an entry in the Domesday Book of 1085. In the great book Bale is recorded by the name ‘’Bathele’’ and it is said to be in the ownership of the King. The main tenant was Harold holding his land from Count Alan.

The villages name means 'Bathing wood/clearing'.

On 1 April 1935 the parish was abolished and merged with Gunthorpe.

The Parish Church
The Parish Church is called All Saints and dates back to the middle of the 14th century. The chancel is slightly older and there is a north transept which indicates that another was planned but never built. The windows have impressive tracery around them.  The church has a  collection of Norwich School stained glass in one of the south nave windows.

The Bale Oak

The Bale Oak was a large oak tree which once stood in the village. The tree measured 36 feet in circumference, was over 500 years old and, reportedly, featured branches over 70 feet long.

History
In the middle of the 14th century, All Saints church was erected immediately east of the site of the tree. According to folk legend, the tree had previously been a site for pre-Christian worship and may have been a part of a larger grove. In 1795, the oak was severely damaged. The oak was heavily pollarded and the removed bark and some of the wood was sold to the Hardys of Letheringsett for tanning. Norfolk historian Francis Blomefield recorded use of the oak in the 18th century:
A great oak at bathele near the church, its hollow so large that ten or twelve men may stand within it and a cobbler had his shop and lodge there of late and it is or was used for a swinestry.

Deemed dangerous by the local populace, the abuse of the tree lead to its destruction in 1860. The Lord of the Manor Sir Willoughby Jones ordered the tree removed and, with much local mourning, the remains taken carted to Cranmer Hall at Fakenham. The site is now covered by a grove of Holm Oak trees and is protected by the National Trust for Places of Historic Interest or Natural Beauty.

Edgar Maurice Rowe and the Titanic
One man who was aboard the  when it hit the iceberg and sank was born in the village. Edgar Rowe was born in Bale in 1882. In 1912 he was age thirty and he was a steward aboard the White Star Liner . He had then become a member of the crew for the delivery voyage of the RMS Titanic from Belfast to Southampton. Rowe was a steward in the first class saloon for which he would have received a monthly wages of £3 15s. Edgar Rowe died in the sinking. His body, if recovered, was never identified.

War Memorial
Bale's war memorial takes the form of a plaque in All Saints' Church and holds the following names from the First World War:
 Private George Cushion (1892-1917), 11th Battalion, Suffolk Regiment
 Private Arthur Bennell (1898-1918), 2nd Battalion, Queen's Own Royal West Kent Regiment
 James H. Allison
 George Cook
 Alec Gray
 Benjamin Greaves
 Thomas Harrison
 Albert Preston
 George Preston
 Leonard Ramm
 Sydney Smith

And, the following for the Second World War:
 Lance-Corporal Arthur J. Ramm (1915-1942), 6th Battalion, Royal Norfolk Regiment

References

External links
 
 

Villages in Norfolk
Former civil parishes in Norfolk
North Norfolk